Hubert Melville Martineau (24 October 1891 – 11 September 1976) was an English patron of cricket and organiser of his own team. He also played three first-class matches between 1931 and 1932. When he played, he was a right-handed batsman and left-arm orthodox spin bowler.

Biography

Born in Westminster in 1891, the son of Philip Martineau, Hubert Martineau was educated at Eton, though he did not play for the school's cricket team. He did however develop a great love of the game.

Club cricket of a high standard was played at his private ground near Maidenhead between 1923 and 1939, and four national sides touring England began their tours playing against his personal XI; Australia in 1926, New Zealand in 1927, the West Indies in 1928 and India in 1932. Martineau himself played in all those matches with the exception of the 1926 match against Australia.

In 1927, he went on a tour of Egypt with the Free Foresters, playing two matches against the national side. He took his own team to the country each year between 1929 and 1939, and Martineau played in each match.

He played three first-class matches in the early 1930s, for HDG Leveson-Gower's XI. He played against Oxford University in 1931 and against Cambridge and Oxford University in 1932. He died in Westminster in 1976.

His stepson was Henry Martineau.

References

External links
 Short film of HM Martineau's XI v New Zealanders, played in May 1927 at HM Martineau's Ground

1891 births
1976 deaths
People educated at Eton College
People from Westminster
English cricketers
H. D. G. Leveson Gower's XI cricketers
Liberal Party (UK) parliamentary candidates